The Hill Building is a 17-story modernistic skyscraper located in Durham, North Carolina. Built in 1935–1937, the Hill Building was designed by New York City architecture firm Shreve, Lamb & Harmon, best known for the design of the Empire State Building.

Named for John Sprunt Hill, and built to house the Durham Bank & Trust Company, the building is outfitted with Art Deco ornamentation, interior fluted doors and an exquisitely crafted letter box.  The building is in the heart of downtown Durham, located at the intersection of Main and Corcoran Streets.  The Hill building was home to Durham Bank & Trust and its successor, Central Carolina Bank and Trust, from 1937 until its 2005 purchase by SunTrust Banks, which had its local headquarters in the building until 2006.

Greenfire Real Estate Holdings, which bought the Hill Building in 2006, successfully renovated the building into a 165-room luxury hotel. The city of Durham voted to add $4.2 million after a September 20, 2010 public hearing regarding this plan, and Durham County voted to add $1 million. Greenfire hoped historic tax credits would provide $11 million, and other tax credits would add $4 million.

In February 2013, Greenfire formed a joint venture with Kentucky-based hotel operator 21C Museum Hotels.   Construction began in late July 2013 and was completed in 2015.

Skanska was in charge of the construction project in partnership with 21c Museum Hotels. The renovation also includes a plan for a contemporary art museum, upscale restaurants, bar and ballroom. The museum is open 24 hours per day and offers free admission. An estimated $48 million was spent to complete the entire renovation for the Hill Building. The hotel itself was inducted into Historic Hotels of America, the official program of the National Trust for Historic Preservation, in 2019.

References

External links
 Construction history, with photos

Buildings and structures completed in 1935
Art Deco architecture in North Carolina
Skyscraper office buildings in North Carolina
Bank company headquarters in the United States
Skyscrapers in Durham, North Carolina